"Go Away" is a song by Cuban American singer and songwriter Gloria Estefan. It was released in April 1993 as the fourth and last single worldwide and third to the United States from her fourth solo album and second compilation, Greatest Hits (1992). The song is much in the style of Estefan's earlier songs with the Miami Sound Machine. It was a club hit throughout Europe and America and was featured in the 1993 film Made in America, starring Whoopi Goldberg and Ted Danson, and its soundtrack. It reached the UK Top 20 and US Dance Chart Top 5.

On a November, 2020 episode of the TV show The View, Estefan indicated that "Go Away" would be the perfect song for Donald Trump to dance to in a conga line leaving the White House.

Critical reception
AllMusic editor Jose F. Promis described "Go Away" as a "irresistible Latin-flavored dance track". Larry Flick from Billboard remarked that "the traditional salsa flavor that has dominated her previous uptempo tunes is evident, but it is tempered with savvy house elements. Also, Estefan's vocal is easily her most relaxed and playful to date." He also wrote, "Tropical spice and a hi-NRG tempo are a happy marriage here, while cute vocals and sound effects are icing on the cake." Dave Sholin from the Gavin Report felt the song is a "fun, upbeat production." In his weekly UK chart commentary, James Masterton stated, "Gloria Estefan makes a strong comeback with another track from her Greatest Hits album, and in a similar vein to the Miami Hitmix". 

Pan-European magazine Music & Media wrote that "the Cuban exile Estefan addresses her anger against dictator Fidel Castro. "People have a right to party", our little rebel sings, musically going back to her Latin roots." Alan Jones from Music Week gave it three out of five and named it Pick of the Week, saying that the song finds the singer "camping it up". He added, "A hit, but not a big one." A reviewer from The Network Forty felt that "it's been too long since Gloria Estefan has given us an uptempo hit record", and noted that "Go Away" is reminiscent of the early Miami Sound Machine hits; "it has the energy of "Rhythm Is Gonna Get You" and "1-2-3"." James Hamilton from the RM Dance Update described it as "catchy [and] conga kicking".

Music video
A music video was produced to promote the single, directed by American television and film director and producer Kevin Layne. It was later published on YouTube in October 2013. The video has amassed over 400,000 views as of September 2021.

Official versions

 Album Version – 4:37
 Radio Edit (aka Single Remix) – John Haag & Pablo Flores – 3:49
 12" Mix (aka 12" Remix) – John Haag & Pablo Flores – 6:14
 Dub Mix – John Haag & Pablo Flores – 6:25

 Underground Vocal Mix – Tommy Musto – 6:30
 Underground Dub – Tommy Musto – 6:30
 Underground Instrumental Mix – Tommy Musto – 6:14
 Bonus Beats – Tommy Musto – 2:05

Track listings

Charts

References

1993 singles
Gloria Estefan songs
Songs written by Gloria Estefan
Songs written by Lawrence Dermer
Epic Records singles
1993 songs